Jennison Heaton (April 16, 1904 – August 6, 1971) was an American bobsled and skeleton racer. He competed at the 1928 Winter Olympics and won a gold medal in the skeleton event and a silver in the five-man bobsleigh competition. In the skeleton, Heaton beat the silver medalist (his younger brother John) by one second. His other brother Trowbridge was also a bobsleigh enthusiast. Heaton later married Beulah Fiske, becoming the brother-in-law of Billy Fiske, also an Olympic bobsledder.

References

Further reading

External links

 Bobsleigh five-man Olympic medalists for 1928
 DatabaseOlympics.com profile
 Men's skeleton Olympic medalists since 1928

1904 births
1971 deaths
American male bobsledders
American male skeleton racers
Bobsledders at the 1928 Winter Olympics
Skeleton racers at the 1928 Winter Olympics
Olympic skeleton racers of the United States
Olympic gold medalists for the United States in skeleton
Olympic silver medalists for the United States in bobsleigh
Medalists at the 1928 Winter Olympics
20th-century American people